Christian Siegmund Liebe (5 November 1654 – 3 September 1708) was a German composer.

Liebe was born in Freiberg, Saxony. He studied in Leipzig, then was a private teacher in Dresden and from 1684 Rektor and organist in Frauenstein, then from 1690 Rektor in Zschopau till his death. Many vocal works survive in a rather conservative style.  He died in Zschopau, aged 53.

Works, editions and recordings
O Heiland aller Welt - recording on collection by Sächsisches Vocalensemble, Batzdorfer Hofkapelle, directed Matthias Jung CPO 2009.

References

German classical composers
German Baroque composers
1654 births
1708 deaths
German male classical composers